In geometry and topology, it is a usual axiom of a manifold to be a Hausdorff space. In general topology, this axiom is relaxed, and one studies non-Hausdorff manifolds: spaces locally homeomorphic to Euclidean space, but not necessarily Hausdorff.

Examples

Line with two origins

The most familiar non-Hausdorff manifold is the line with two origins, or bug-eyed line.

This is the quotient space of two copies of the real line

with the equivalence relation

 
where  is any positive real number. Thus, in this space all neighbourhoods of  intersect all neighbourhoods of  so the space is non-Hausdorff. The space is however locally Hausdorff in the sense that each point has a Hausdorff neighbourhood.

Further, the line with two origins does not have the homotopy type of a CW-complex, or of any Hausdorff space.

Branching line

Similar to the line with two origins is the branching line.

This is the quotient space of two copies of the real line

with the equivalence relation

This space has a single point for each negative real number  and two points  for every non-negative number: it has a "fork" at zero.

Etale space

The etale space of a sheaf, such as the sheaf of continuous real functions over a manifold, is a manifold that is often non-Hausdorff. (The etale space is Hausdorff if it is a sheaf of functions with some sort of analytic continuation property.)

Properties

Because non-Hausdorff manifolds are locally homeomorphic to Euclidean space, they are locally metrizable (but not metrizable) and locally Hausdorff (but not Hausdorff).

See also

Notes

References

 
 

General topology
Manifolds
Separation axioms
Topology